Grant Piro is an Australian actor. He is best known as the host of the children's television show Couch Potato on the Australian Broadcasting Corporation. He also appeared as Captain Schnepel in Escape From Pretoria.

Career
He began his career in 1983 in the Australian television soap opera Sons and Daughters.

After completing George Miller's film Bushfire Moon (Miracle Down Under) in 1987, a chance meeting with British comedy legend Ray Cooney led to a three-year stint in the UK where he appeared in several of Ray's plays: It Runs In The Family, Wife Begins At Forty, the latter alongside the great Jimmy Edwards, as well as TV programs such as Casualty and Shelley.

He returned to Australia in 1990 to become the host of the ABC children's television program Couch Potato. During the 1990s, Grant appeared in a large number of Australian television dramas that included Janus, Correlli, G.P., Halifax f.p., Blue Heelers, SeaChange, Wildside, Good Guys Bad Guys, McLeod's Daughters, The River Kings, The Territorians, Stingers, Twisted Tales, Tales of the South Seas, Witch Hunt, and more. This trend continued beyond 2000 with appearances in Blue Heelers again, Marshall Law, Stingers, Crashburn, Headland, Rain Shadow, The Librarians, The Elephant Princess, Sea Patrol, and most recently Miss Fisher's Murder Mysteries.

Grant Piro has also become one of Australia's foremost and respected theatre actors with performances in Under Milk Wood, Whose Life Is It Anyway, Moby Dick, The Merry Widow, Laughter on the 23rd Floor, The Producers, The 39 Steps, Cat On A Hot Tin Roof, Dirty Rottten Scoundrels, The Drowsy Chaperone, Hairspray, His Girl Friday, and Hate.

His performance in the Melbourne Theatre Company's production of Realism saw him critically acclaimed for his display of the acting technique known as biomechanics. He appeared as several characters in the Rolf DeHeer cult film Bad Boy Bubby, worked with film director Scott Hicks on his films Call Me Mr. Brown and Sebastian and the Sparrow, with Paul Hogan in Crocodile Dundee in Los Angeles, appeared in the French feature L'Amour En Embuscade for Carl Shultz, and the films The Outsider, Darkness Falls, The Condemned, Save Your Legs, and Crime & Punishment.

Television credits 
 Sons and Daughters (1984)
 Captain Johnno telemovie (1988)
 Couch Potato (TV series) (1991) - Host/Presenter
 The Finder/Finders Keepers (1991)
 McLeod's Daughters (1996)
Halifax f.p. (1998)
 SeaChange (1998)
 CrashBurn (2003)
 City Homicide (2007)
 The Librarians (2007)
 Rain Shadow (2007)
 The Elephant Princess (2008)
Miss Fisher's Murder Mysteries(2015)

Film credits 
 Playing Beatie Bow (1986) - as Pino 
 Bushfire Moon (1987) - as Angus  Watson
 Bad Boy Bubby (1993)
 Joey (1997) - as John O'Bannon
 Mr. Accident (2000) - as Lyndon
 Crocodile Dundee in Los Angeles (2001) - as the Guide
 Darkness Falls (2003)
 The Independent (2007)
 The Condemned – as Moyer
 Escape from Pretoria as Captain Schnepel (2020)

Theatre credits 
 The Producers (2004) – as Carmen Ghia
 The 39 Steps (2008)
 Realism (2009)
 The Drowsy Chaperone (2010)
 Hairspray (2010) – as Wilbur Turnblad
 Around the World in 80 Days (2016) – as Detective Fix

Personal life
He is married to Australian soprano and musical theatre icon Marina Prior. They have 5 children in a blended family. Two of the children are biologically Piro’s from a former relationship Jackson and Madison, while three are biologically Prior’s from a former relationship.

References

External links

Australian male film actors
Australian male television actors
Living people
Year of birth missing (living people)